Guru Nanak College Ground is a cricket ground in Velachery, Chennai. Also known as India Cement Limited Guru Nanak College Ground for sponsorship reasons, it is named after the Sikh Guru Nanak. The college ground was founded in 1971 on the 500th anniversary of Guru Nanak.

The ground has been used for first class cricket since 1978. It has hosted Ranji Trophy matches since 1996 for Tamil Nadu and a Women's One Day International in 2002. It is one of the venues for hosting warm-up matches for the 2016 ICC Women's World Twenty20.

See also
Guru Nanak College, Chennai
List of cricket grounds in India
Sport in India

References

External links

Cricket grounds in Tamil Nadu
Memorials to Guru Nanak
Sports venues completed in 1971
1971 establishments in Tamil Nadu
Sports venues in Chennai
20th-century architecture in India